TRAF-interacting protein is a protein that in humans is encoded by the TRAIP gene.

This gene encodes a protein that contains an N-terminal RING finger motif and a putative coiled-coil domain. A similar murine protein interacts with TNFR-associated factor 1 (TRAF1), TNFR-associated factor 2 (TRAF2), and cylindromatosis. The interaction with TRAF2 inhibits TRAF2-mediated nuclear factor kappa-B, subunit 1 activation that is required for cell activation and protection against apoptosis.

Interactions 

TRAF interacting protein has been shown to interact with FLII, TRAF1 and TRAF2.

References

Further reading

External links